Sophronia gelidella is a moth of the family Gelechiidae. It was described by Nordmann in 1941. It is found in Norway, Sweden, Finland and northern Russia. It has also been recorded from North America (Yukon).

The wingspan is 17–19 mm.

The larvae feed on Dryas octopetala.

References

Moths described in 1941
Sophronia (moth)